Club Hípico de Santiago is a thoroughbred horse race track in Santiago, Chile.

History 
The Club Hípico de Santiago, opened in 1870, is Chile's oldest racetrack and home to South America's oldest stakes race, the Clásico El Ensayo. It is one of Chile's three main tracks, the others being Hipodromo Chile and Valparaiso Sporting Club.

Physical attributes 
Club Hípico features a wide right-handed turf course, approximately 2400 m (12 furlongs) long, and is landscaped with gardens, fountains and ponds.

Concerts

Racing 
Live racing takes place every Friday, every other Monday and on some Sundays. Racedays are extremely long by International standards, usually featuring around 18 races per card.

2007 Major Stakes Schedule

External links

 Home Page
 Racecourse Profile on Horse Racing South America

Horse racing venues in Chile
Music venues in Chile
Sports venues in Santiago